Trachylepis comorensis (Comoro Island skink) is a species of skink. It is found in the Comoro Islands, Madagascar and Mozambique.

References

Trachylepis
Reptiles of the Comoros
Reptiles of Madagascar
Reptiles of Mozambique
Reptiles described in 1854
Taxa named by Wilhelm Peters